The Kerschbaum Saddle is a  high mountain pass between Alpbachtal and Zillertal in the Austrian federal state of Tyrol.

Location and area 

The pass road runs from Reith im Alpbachtal (near the Inntal) over the top of the pass near Hart im Zillertal. The narrow, tarmac road is a local route; through traffic uses the B169 / B171 (and A12) through the Ziller and Inn valleys further to the west.

See also
 List of highest paved roads in Europe
 List of mountain passes

External links 

 Kerschbaum Saddle at quaeldich.de
 Kerschbaum Saddle at alpenrouten.de

References 

Mountain passes of Tyrol (state)
Mountain passes of the Alps
Kitzbühel Alps